Khader Adnan Mohammad Musa (born on 24 March 1978) is a senior member of the Palestinian Islamist organization Palestinian Islamic Jihad (PIJ) and a prisoner in Israel. He has been held in prison 10 times under administrative detention, a procedure which allows Israel to detain people for periods of 6 months, each renewable, without the filing of charges or a trial. As of June 15, 2015, Israeli authorities had not laid any formal charges against him, but have repeatedly held him for reasons such as "activities that threaten regional security." A visit by an International Committee of the Red Cross delegation  was cancelled after Israel insisted their visit be conducted in their presence, with Khader remaining tied to his bed. He was released on 18 April 2012 after being on hunger strike for 66 days, and rearrested under the same procedure on July 8, 2014.  Khader was released in July, 2015.

Adnan is widely reported as being a spokesman and leader in the Palestinian Islamic Jihad in the West Bank. His wife says he is not involved in militant activities and is a member of the Palestinian reconciliation committee. The PIJ is designated a terrorist group by a number of Western countries and Israel, and Adnan has been convicted in the past by Israel for being a spokesperson for the group. Though he has been detained several times since 1999 on the basis of alleged activities in a terrorist organization, Israel has never charged him with involvement in attacks on Israelis.

He was arrested on 17 December 2011 after midnight. The following day, to protest the conditions of his arrest, Israel's policy of administrative detention and its treatment of Palestinians under Israeli occupation, particularly prisoners, Adnan went on a hunger strike. On 21 Feb 2012 a deal was announced between Adnan and the Israeli authorities whereby they confirmed he would be released on April 17, 2012 and he would immediately end his hunger strike, the longest in Palestinian history.

He was detained again on July 8, 2014 and given a 6-month detention order. His detention was extended in January and May 2015, and on May 5, 2015 he began a second hunger strike.  The government of Israel is determined to force feed him, and has drafted a law for that purpose, but the Israeli Medical Association has issued instructions to doctors to not cooperate with any force feeding.

Adnan owns a bakery and a produce store in his home town of Arraba, near Jenin in the West Bank. He has an undergraduate degree in mathematics, and is pursuing a master's degree in economics. He is married to Randa Adnan, with whom he had two daughters, Maali and Bissan, prior to his 2011 detention, and Randa gave birth to their third child, Abdel Rahman, and in roughly late 2013, gave birth to triplets. By 2021, he was the father of nine children.

On 11th December 2017 the Israeli army detained Khader Adnan again. He resumed an open ended hunger strike on 2nd September 2018.

In May, 2021 he was detained by Israel again. He was reported having spend more than 7 years in Israeli prisons.

Life 

Adnan's political activism dates back to his days as a student. In 1996, while studying for his undergraduate degree in mathematics at Birzeit University, he became a political advocate on behalf of the Palestinian Islamic Jihad (PIJ). A small Palestinian militant organization, the group has carried out suicide bombings and paramilitary operations against civilian and military targets and is considered a terrorist group by Israel, the United States, the European Union, the United Kingdom, Japan, Canada, and Australia.

First arrested and detained by Israel in 1999, he has been detained roughly 10 times since—seven times by Israel (including his current detention), and 2 or 3 times by the Palestinian National Authority (PNA). The Palestinian prisoners' support group Addameer said Adnan has spent a total of six years in prison since 1999.

Adnan spent four months under Israeli administrative capture in 1999. He was arrested by the PNA eight months after being released for leading a student demonstration against Lionel Jospin in 2000. At the demonstration, students threw eggs or stones at the former French Prime Minister during his visit to Birzeit to denounce his characterization of Hezbollah's military actions against the Israeli occupation as "terrorism." His first hunger strike, 10 days long, was undertaken during his detention by the PNA. He spent a year in administrative detention following his December 2002 arrest by Israel. Rearrested six months after his release, he was placed in solitary confinement and went on hunger strike for 28 days until the Israel Prisons Service placed him with the general prison population.

He married his wife Randa Adnan in 2005; by this time he had been detained five times for his affiliation with Palestinian Islamic Jihad (PIJ). His wife said before they married he told her that, "his life was not normal, that he might be around for 15 days and then be gone again for a long time. But I always dreamt of marrying someone strong, someone who struggles in defence of his country."

Adnan has been convicted in the past by Israel for being a spokesperson for the PIJ, and media reports indicate he served as a PIJ spokesman. Gulf News said he has served as a spokesman for the group since 2000, while The Guardian and Agence France Press said he was a "one-time spokesman" for the PIJ in the past. Reports from Xinhua and  Reuters in 2005 said he is considered a "prominent [Islamic] Jihad leader" and a "senior Islamic Jihad official." In June 2005, after PIJ members were killed in a shootout with Israeli troops, Adnan "called on all Palestinian militant groups to resume fighting with Israel" and accused the governing entity the PNA of collaborating with Israel.

In August 2005, Adnan was arrested and imprisoned by Israel for 15 months. According to Addameer, he held a 12-day hunger strike to protest his isolation in Kfar Yona in 2005. A YouTube video of a rally in 2007 shows him praising and encouraging suicide bombings: "Who among you will carry the next explosive belt? Who among you will fire the next bullets? Who among you will have his body parts blown all over?" He was held by Israel for another six months in administrative detention beginning in March 2008. Arrested by the PNA in 2010 for his political activity,  Gideon Levy said he undertook his first hunger strike during this 12-day detention.

2011 detention and hunger strike 

At the time of his most recent arrest, Adnan was no longer an active spokesman for the PIJ. He was working as a baker while studying for a master's degree in economics at the Bir Zeit University. He owns the bakery in nearby Qabatya and a produce store in his hometown of Arraba, near Jenin in the West Bank. A father to two daughters, Maali and Bissan, Randa was pregnant with their third child, when he was arrested by the Israeli Army on 17 December 2011 from their home in Arraba in the middle of the night.<ref name="levy">Levy, Gideon. Twilight Zone / 'One man against the state'. Haaretz. 2012-02-17.</ref> The next day he began a hunger strike that ended 66 days later on 21 February 2012.

In a letter he gave to his lawyers for public release, Adnan explained why he was on hunger strike:

The Israeli occupation has gone to extremes against our people, especially prisoners. I have been humiliated, beaten, and harassed by interrogators for no reason, and thus I swore to God I would fight the policy of administrative detention to which I and hundreds of my fellow prisoners fell prey … The only thing I can do is offer my soul to God, as I believe righteousness and justice will eventually triumph over tyranny and oppression. I hereby assert that I am confronting the occupiers not for my own sake as an individual, but for the sake of thousands of prisoners who are being deprived of their simplest human rights while the world and international community look on. It is time the international community and the UN support prisoners and force the State of Israel to respect international human rights and stop treating prisoners as if they were not humans. Hunger-striking prisoner not backing down . Ma'an News Agency. 2012-02-11.

Adnan was interrogated for 18 days following his arrest; he told his lawyers that during this time Israeli soldiers made sexual innuendos about his wife, mocked his Islamic faith, beat him, tied him to a chair in painful positions, ripped hair from his beard and wiped dirt on his face. Israeli authorities ignored these allegations. According to his wife and lawyers, Adnan's mistreatment continued and included lengthy periods of solitary confinement, multiple strip searches, and continuous abusive interrogation.

He has "officially" been under administrative detention since 10 January 2012, a term that was set to last until 8 May at which point his detention could be renewed if the Israeli authorities deem it necessary. As of 31 December 2011, there were 307 Palestinians in administrative detention, including 21 members of the Palestinian Legislative Council, the parliament of the Palestinian Authority. Under the administrative detention procedure, the Israeli military can hold detainees for renewable six-month periods without charge if it deems them to be security threats. The decision to detain an individual is based on evidence presented to military judges, but not the defendant or his lawyers, and is subject to judicial review.

Adnan has not been formally charged with any crime; Israel claimed that he was arrested "for activities that threaten regional security." BBC, CNN and Al Jazeera reported that Adnan is believed to be a leader of the PIJ in the West Bank. Bikya Masr reported he is a "senior leader of the Islamic Jihad organization" and according to Al-Ahram, He is a "leading figure in Islamic Jihad."

It is not known if Adnan was directly involved in attacks on Israelis; he has never been charged as such by Israel. His wife Randa denied Adnan had any leadership role in the PIJ, or any role in militant activities, and said he was a member of a Palestinian reconciliation committee. She told YNET in 2011 that, "It's true that he was the Islamic Jihad's spokesman during the intifada, but over the past four years he had nothing to do with it … He hadn't talked to anyone from the Islamic Jihad. He left that activity altogether."

He was transferred to a hospital on December 30 but refused treatment from Israeli doctors. After meeting Adnan in the hospital, the organization Physicians for Human Rights – Israel, expressed "grave concern" and about his situation, which its doctors described as "critical." About 50 days into his hunger strike his wife Randa was permitted to visit him and stated he appeared emaciated and dirty and was shackled to his hospital bed.

On 9 February, in response to criticism from human rights groups, the Israeli Prison Authority stated Adnan's case was being "strictly according to the law … with special attention being given to his humanitarian situation." The prison service also stated that Adnan agreed to take potassium pills and does not want to die.

Randa Adnan appealed to Egyptian authorities to help release her husband stating "Hope is now in Egypt to release Adnan. There's talk about Egyptian efforts to do so and I hope it's true. Egypt had an active role in the last prisoner exchange deal between Hamas and Israel – it is our older sister and we hope it intervenes." The Palestinian Ministry of Prisoners' Affairs confirmed that Egypt was intervening with Israel to release Adnan. She has also said that Adnan will not backtrack on his decision, and that, "When I married him I knew I should expect anything. I am proud of him whether he is under the ground or above it."

Almost two months into his hunger strike, it was reported that Adnan agreed to having electrolytes, vitamins, glucose, and salts added to the water he is drinking. His doctors noted that, "A fast in excess of 70 days does not permit survival. Infusion of liquids, adjustment of salts, and the addition of glucose and vitamin cannot prevent certain death due to such a protracted hunger strike."

An Israeli military court judge rejected his first appeal against detention in a session convened at a hospital in Safed where he was being held on 13 February 2012.

On 16 February, Adnan's lawyers petitioned the Supreme Court of Israel to release him, citing that Adnan is in "immediate danger of death." Lawyer Mahmoud Kassandra stated "This is the last chance. The medical report says he could die at any minute. We hope this will succeed but I am not optimistic." Following a visit to Adnan by Rebecca Ziv from Physicians for Human Rights – Israel, she said of his situation:

He has lost 30kg and weighs 60kg. He suffers from stomach aches, vomiting, sometimes with blood, and headaches … His general condition is pale and very weak, his tongue is smooth, he has slight bleeding from the gums, dry skin, loss of hair, and significant muscular atrophy. His pulse is weak, blood pressure 100/75. He is permanently connected to a heart monitor.

The Supreme Court initially scheduled a hearing for 23 February but moved it to 21 February following concerns about his health. Moments before the hearing was convened, it was announced that a deal had been reached between Adnan's lawyers and the Israeli prosecution lawyers whereby Adnan would stop his hunger strike in exchange for his 4-month detention being counted from the day of his arrest and a promise not to renew his administrative detention barring the presentation of any new evidence.

 2014 detention and hunger strike 

In spite of the agreement to end his first hunger strike (see above), Adnan was arrested again on July 8, 2014, at the beginning of the 2014 Israel–Gaza conflict, and has been held in detention ever since, beginning his second hunger strike on May 5, 2015. The government of Israel is seemingly determined to break Adnan's hunger strike using force feeding techniques similar to those used by the USA in its Guantanamo Bay prison camp. Israeli Minister of Public Security Gilad Erdan was quoted as saying "Security prisoners are interested in turning hunger strikes into a new kind of suicide attack that would threaten the State of Israel. We cannot allow anyone to threaten us and we will not allow prisoners to die in our prisons." However, the Israeli Medical Society and various human rights groups are deploring this planned course of action by Israel, with the Medical Society issuing orders to Israeli doctors to not participate in any planned forced feedings except under certain limited circumstances not applicable to Adnan at this point in time.

 Reactions 

Adnan's hunger strike has drawn critical scrutiny of Israel's practice of administrative detention by a number of human rights groups, international bodies and Palestinian leaders and protesters. He has garnered a large following on Facebook and Twitter. Several of Adnan's supporters argue his case has not received proper coverage in the international and Israeli media.

 Demonstrations and solidarity strikes 

Some Palestinians have protested in the West Bank and the Gaza Strip in support of Adnan. Hundreds of Palestinian prisoners have joined Adnan's hunger strike in solidarity. Adnan's father Musa Adnan started an open-ended hunger strike on 6 February, telling Ma'an News Agency'' it would "enable him to support his son and understand his pain." His hometown of Arraba has been a center of demonstrations, with solidarity protesters camping outside his house which Palestinian and foreign officials have been visiting to inquire about Adnan's health conditions. Around 50-60 Palestinian protested outside the Church of the Nativity in Bethlehem to show solidarity with Adnan on 8 February.

On 11 February hundreds of Palestinians staged a demonstration at the Ofer Prison where Adnan was being held. The Israeli Army dispersed the protesters using rubber bullets and tear gas, injuring 16. At a separate demonstration in Beit Ummar near Hebron two Israelis and two Palestinians were arrested by Israel. Dozens of students from Birzeit University that gathered outside Ofer Prison on 13 February demanding Adnan's release were dispersed by Israeli security forces resulting in the injury of 23 people.  On 15 February, supporters began an open hunger strike at a sit-in in front of the International Committee of the Red Cross in Gaza City.

On 16 February, the 61st day of Adnan's hunger strike, thousands of demonstrators protested throughout the Palestinian territories. About 1,000 mostly young Palestinians protested outside of Ofer Prison before being dispersed and in Hebron, hundreds of supporters held a sit-in holding posters reading "No to administrative arbitrary detention." That same day, Palestinians observed a 10-hour hunger strike in solidarity.

Around 5,000 protesters demonstrated in Gaza City on 17 February chanting "We are all Khader Adnan," with the PIJ, Hamas and Fatah factions all participating.  In Jenin, meanwhile, hundreds of Palestinians partook in a solidarity protest.

Human rights groups 

Addameer, a Palestinian prisoners' support group expressed "utmost concern about the health" of Adnan, holding Israel accountable for his life. The head of the Palestinian Prisoners' Society Qadura Fares condemned the Israeli court's refusal of Adnan's appeal.

Human Rights Watch stated Israel must "immediately end its unlawful administrative detention" of Adnan and "charge or release him." Spokeswoman Sarah Leah Whitson said "Israel should end, today, before it's too late, its almost two-month-long refusal to inform Adnan of any criminal charge or evidence against him." Amnesty International condemned Israel's policy of administrative detention, and the Israeli human rights group B'tselem sent an urgent request to Israeli Minister of Intelligence, Dan Meridor, to either immediately release or try Adnan to "prevent a needless tragedy to him and his family."

Richard Falk, the UN Special Rapporteur on Palestinian human rights, criticized "authority figures, from the UN Secretary General on down," who he said expressed empathy for Gilad Shalit, while being "notably silent in the much more compelling ordeal being experienced before our eyes in the form of Mr Adnan's captivity, seemingly unto death.".

Politicians 

The Palestinian National Authority condemned his arrest and demanded his immediate release. In response to Israel's refusal of Adnan's appeal, Minister of Prisoners' Affairs Issa Qaraqe stated the decision showed "utter disregard for Adnan's life, effectively condemning him to die." He praised Adnan for "taking a stand" against the use of administrative detention. At a rally on 16 February, Qaraqe said, "Khader Adnan has become a national symbol, an Arab symbol and an international symbol for his defence of the dignity of free men throughout the entire world."

Palestinian lawmaker Mustafa Barghouti, who was injured after being shot in the foot with a rubber bullet by Israeli security forces during a solidarity protest, called for an international campaign demanding Adnan's release. Palestinian Islamic Jihad leaders Sheikh Nafez Azzam, Dawood Shihab, Khader Habib and Ahmad Mudallal participated in the open hunger strike that began on 15 February saying it was the "least we can do for this legendary symbol."

At a Friday sermon at the Great Mosque of Gaza, PIJ leader Nafez Azzam stated Adnan was  "not fighting for a personal cause, but for the defence of thousands of prisoners." Furthermore, he accused Arab and Western countries of ignoring Adnan's case saying "Shame on the nations of hundreds of millions (of Muslims) for the fact that Khader Adnan is still in prison." Gaza-based Prime Minister Ismail Haniyeh, declared at a rally in Gaza that same day that, "The Palestinian people, with all its components and its factions, will never abandon the hero prisoners, especially those who lead this hunger strike battle."

On 18 February, it was reported that in meetings with officials from China, Russia, the United Kingdom and the European Union, President Mahmoud Abbas and PLO negotiator Saeb Erekat pressed for Adnan's release.

United Nations Special Coordinator for the Middle East peace process Robert Serry instructed Israel "to do everything in its power to preserve the health of the prisoner and resolve this case while abiding by all legal obligations under international law." On 18 February, European Union head Catherine Ashton called on Israel to preserve Adnan's health and reiterated the EU's concern over "the extensive use by Israel of administrative detention without formal charge."

See also 

 Muhammad al-Qiq
 Abdulhadi Alkhawaja
 Bobby Sands, of the 1981 Irish hunger strike
 Hana Shalabi
 Maikel Nabil Sanad

References

External links 
 Khader Adnan’s Life in Grave Danger as He Continues His Struggle Against Israel’s Human Rights Violations
 According to a Medical Opinion Issued by PHR – Israel Doctor: Adnan's Life is in Immediate Danger

1978 births
Birzeit University alumni
Civil disobedience
Islamic Jihad Movement in Palestine members
Living people
People from Arraba, Jenin
Palestinian people imprisoned by Israel
Palestinian hunger strikers